Mia Gracia is a Philippine television drama series broadcast by GMA Network. Directed by Herman Escueta, it stars Jessica "Gracia" Cortez. It premiered on August 12, 1996. The series concluded on August 15, 1997 with a total of 263 episodes.

Cast and characters
Lead cast
 Jessica "Gracia" Cortez as Gracia Paraiso / Mia Perdon

Supporting cast
 Alvin Anson as Troy
 Raffy Rodriguez as Paeng
 Joanne Pascual as Joan
 Mikee Villanueva as Leah
 Iwi Nicolas as Mica
 Brando Legaspi as Alex
 Zenie Zabala
 Gary Estrada
 Anita Linda
 Glenda Garcia

References

1996 Philippine television series debuts
1997 Philippine television series endings
Filipino-language television shows
GMA Network drama series
Television series by TAPE Inc.
Television shows set in the Philippines